Banning is a ghost town in Pine County, in the U.S. state of Minnesota.

History
A post office called Banning was established in 1896, and remained in operation until 1912. The community was named for William L. Banning, a railroad contractor.

References

Former municipalities in Minnesota
Geography of Pine County, Minnesota
Ghost towns in Minnesota